Nassarius wolffi, common name the Torben Wolff nassa, is a species of sea snail, a marine gastropod mollusk in the family Nassariidae, the Nassa mud snails or dog whelks. It is named after the Danish marine biologist Torben Wolff.

Description
The length of the shell varies between 25 mm and 45 mm.

Distribution
This species occurs in the Western Mediterranean Sea and in the Atlantic Ocean off the Cape Verde Islands and Angola. Also found in Namibia.

References

External links
 

Nassariidae
Gastropods described in 1956
Molluscs of the Atlantic Ocean
Molluscs of the Mediterranean Sea
Molluscs of Angola
Gastropods of Cape Verde